Paul Edward McLeay (born 23 August 1972), a former Australian politician, was a member of the New South Wales Legislative Assembly representing the electorate of Heathcote for the Labor Party between 2003 and 2011.

In 2010, McLeay resigned his position as a Minister on 1 September 2010 after he admitted using a parliamentary computer to visit gambling websites. He was the fifth minister to resign from Kristina Keneally's Labor government.

Early years and background
McLeay is the son of Janice McLeay, former Commissioner of the NSW Industrial Relations Commission, and Leo McLeay, a former Speaker of the Australian House of Representatives between 1989 and 1993.

He is married to Cassandra Wilkinson, author, past president of FBi Radio and senior public servant. They have two children. Prior to entering politics, McLeay held the position of Assistant General Secretary of the NSW Public Service Association.

New South Wales parliamentary career
On entering Parliament, McLeay was appointed parliamentary Secretary to the Minister for Health and Chairman of the Public Accounts Committee. In 2009, he was appointed Minister for Ports and Waterways and Minister for the Illawarra. In June 2010, McLeay was appointed Minister for Mineral and Forest Resources. In September 2010, McLeay resigned as a Minister.

McLeay was a Director of Engadine District Youth Services and President of the Bundeena volunteer fire brigade.

References

External links
 Speeches by Paul McLeay in Hansard
 

Members of the New South Wales Legislative Assembly
Living people
1972 births
Australian Labor Party members of the Parliament of New South Wales
Labor Right politicians
21st-century Australian politicians